Serrata boussoufae is a species of sea snail, a marine gastropod mollusk in the family Marginellidae, the margin snails.

Description
The length of the shell attains 7.5 mm.

The Serrata boussoufae has a trophic level of a predator. The shell is made of calcium carbonate.

Distribution
This marine species occurs off Madagascar.

References

 Bozzetti L. & Briano B. (2008). Serrataginella boussoufae (Gastropoda: Prosobranchia: Marginellidae) nuova specie dal Madagascar Nord-Orientale. Malacologia Mostra Mondiale 60: 5-7

Marginellidae
Gastropods described in 2008